The 1958 Lebanon crisis (also known as the Lebanese Civil War of 1958) was a political crisis in Lebanon caused by political and religious tensions in the country that included a United States military intervention. The intervention lasted for around three months until President Camille Chamoun, who had requested the assistance, completed his term as president of Lebanon. American and Lebanese government forces successfully occupied the Port of Beirut and Beirut International Airport. With the crisis over, the United States withdrew.

Background

Arab Cold War 

After the end of World War II in 1945, the United States and Soviet Union were the two major world powers. Two years later, the Truman Doctrine was issued, aimed at containing the spread of communism and the Soviet Union. The Cold War is generally considered to have begun around this time. As the world divided into the Eastern (communist) and Western (capitalist) Blocs, a struggle for ideological geopolitical supremacy between the US and USSR emerged. One of the ways it manifested was through proxy wars in various global regions. One of those regions was the Middle East, where the Arab Cold War took place. After the Suez Crisis in 1956, there was an increase in Arab hostility to the United States as well as increased Soviet influence in Egypt and Syria. The crisis also encouraged pan-Arabism and increased the popularity and influence of Gamal Abdel Nasser, President of Egypt. The United States feared that the region was susceptible to the spread of communism.

The Eisenhower Doctrine was announced by President of the United States Dwight D. Eisenhower in January 1957. It pledged American economic and military aid to prevent communism from spreading in the Middle East. The United States Congress passed the doctrine on March 7 and it was signed into law on March 9. James P. Richards began to tour the Middle East and the Joint Chiefs of Staff and United States European Command began to make plans for intervention in the region. Their plan centered around the United States Sixth Fleet, stationed in the Mediterranean Sea, the Middle East Force and several Air Force units. 11,000 soldiers were made ready for combat in the region. While the doctrine was never formally invoked, the US supported Hussein of Jordan in 1957 against an alleged coup attempt and moved to prevent communism from spreading in Syria.

The situation in Lebanon
The partition of the Ottoman Empire divided present-day Syria and Lebanon under the Mandate for Syria and the Lebanon in 1923. Lebanon completely became an independent nation on 22 November 1943 when the French Mandate formally ended. Around the time of independence, the National Pact was agreed upon, stating that, among other things, "Lebanon was to be a completely independent sovereign state. The Christians were to forego seeking foreign [...] protection or attempting to bring Lebanon under foreign control or influence. In return, the Muslims were to forego making any attempt to bring Lebanon into any political union with Syria, or into the formation of any Arab Union". The Pact marked a compromise between several religious sects living in the country—namely Maronite Christians, Sunni Muslims, Shia Muslims, Greek Orthodox Christians, Greek Catholic Christians and Druzes.

Camille Chamoun was elected as the second President of Lebanon in the presidential elections in 1952, replacing Bechara El Khoury in the post. Described as "quite openly anti-Communist", the United States viewed Chamoun as "definitely our friend." In 1957, shortly after the announcement of the Eisenhower Doctrine—which Chamoun's regime had been the only Arab government to openly endorse "without reservation"—the United States became concerned that parliamentary elections set for June would result in the election of a parliament that was hostile to the US. Many Muslims in the nation supported Nasser and the United Arab Republic (UAR). Kamal Jumblatt and Rashid Karami, Druze and Sunni leaders, respectively, condemned Chamoun's support for the doctrine as violating the National Pact. US attempts to influence the election included approving the sending of $12.7 million in military or financial aid and sending operatives from the Central Intelligence Agency (including David Atlee Phillips, Miles Copeland Jr. and Wilbur Eveland) to the region, who provided "campaign contributions" towards pro-West politicians. In late May 1957 pro-Chamoun troops killed seven and wounded seventy-three protesters in Beirut and the following month opposition leaders argued that Chamoun "had bought so many votes and gerrymandered so many districts that the balloting would be meaningless." The election was an American success, as fifty-three out of sixty-six parliamentarians supported Chamoun. The US continued to provide aid to Chamoun, fearing Soviet and UAR influence in the region. Chamun's opponents maintained that the election was invalid and needed to be re-held.

On 8 May 1958 a Lebanese journalist, Nasib Al Matni, was assassinated in his office in Beirut. He was a pro-Nasserist and anti-Chamoun Maronite. Following this incident intensive protests occurred in Beirut and Tripoli. 

In 1958, Camille Chamoun was in the sixth and final year of his term as President of Lebanon.

Heightened tensions 
On 1 February 1958, Syria and Egypt united, forming the UAR. The United States feared initially that the new nation would become the dominant power in the Middle East, but recognized it on February 25 after deciding that the UAR could be beneficial in halting communism's spread and keeping Nasser contained. Chamoun and Charles Malik worried that "the peril of subversion in Lebanon" by the UAR "was immediate" and asked for American aid.

Tensions were increasing in Lebanon throughout early 1958. Although Chamoun's term would have expired on 23 September 1958, he intended to run for president again, which was not permitted in the Constitution of Lebanon, and asked for American support in his effort. While the United States feared that a movement against Chamoun could harm their interests in the region, they were reluctant to withdraw support for him, as Fouad Chehab, the chief of staff of the Lebanese Army, was the most likely figure to succeed Chamoun. Robert M. McClintock, American ambassador to Lebanon, described Chehab as "a neutral legume who would require careful pruning to grow in the right direction." As a result, the US did not formally support Chamoun's effort.

Protests by various groups—mainly the Sunnis and the Druzes—began in February against the Christian Chamoun, who had also aligned himself in support of the US and Britain, actions that protesters considered breaches of the National Pact. Demonstrations also protested that Chamoun had not allowed Lebanon to join the UAR. The protesters felt that "Chamoun was not willing to modify his foreign policy unless he was forced to." Tensions between Maronite Christians and Arab Muslims continued to rise after the killing of Nasib Al Matni on 8 May. Matni was the editor of Al Telegraf and had been critical of Chamoun's rule. Fighting erupted on the streets of Beirut as a Muslim mob burned the US Information Service library down. Heightened tensions existed around the country, including in the Beqaa Valley, where Shia militants were receiving weapons from Syria. The New York Times dated the beginning of a formal armed rebellion to 10 May 1958. Chamoun requested American military intervention in early May against the threat to his power under the Eisenhower Doctrine, although McClintock noted that there was an "absence of overt Communist aggression".

The leader of the UAR, Nasser, began publicly calling for Arab unity. Various nations, including Lebanon, blamed Nasser's actions for the increase in sectarian unrest, and the Lebanese government filed a formal complaint to the United Nations Security Council (UNSC) on 22 May 1958, accusing the UAR of meddling in the nation's affairs. The UNSC passed a resolution on 11 June 1958 that recommended sending a group to Lebanon "to ensure that there is no illegal infiltration of personnel or supply of arms or other material across the Lebanese borders". A "Group of Three"—Galo Plaza, Rajeshwar Dayal and Odd Bull—Dag Hammarskjöld, the Secretary-General of the United Nations, and members of the United Nations Truce Supervision Organization were soon dispatched to Lebanon to form the United Nations Observation Group in Lebanon (UNOGIL).

Operation Blue Bat

Eisenhower responded by authorizing Operation Blue Bat on 15 July 1958, in the first application of the Eisenhower Doctrine in which the US announced that it would intervene to protect regimes that it considered to be threatened by international communism. The goal of the operation was to bolster Chamoun's pro-Western Lebanese government from internal opposition and threats from Syria and Egypt. The plan was to occupy and secure Beirut International Airport, a few miles south of the city, and then to secure the port of Beirut and the approaches to the city.

At the end of June, Essex and Boston were anchored at Piraeus, Greece, while Des Moines, from which Vice Admiral Charles R. Brown was flying his flag, was at Villefranche-sur-Mer, France. Land forces included the 2nd Provisional Marine Force (Task Force 62) and the United States Army Task Force 201 at the tactical level. Each of these three components influenced Operations Plan 215-58 and its execution.

The operation involved more than 14,000 men, including 8,509 US Army personnel, a contingent from the 1st Airborne Battle Group, 187th Infantry from the 24th Infantry Division and 5,670 officers and men of the United States Marine Corps (the 2nd Provisional Marine Force, of Battalion Landing Teams 1st Battalion, 8th Marines and 2nd Battalion, 2nd Marines under Brigadier General Sidney S. Wade). The 2nd Battalion, 8th Marines arrived on July 16 after a 54-hour airlift from Cherry Point, North Carolina. They were supported by a fleet of 70 ships and 40,000 sailors. On 16 July 1958, Admiral James L. Holloway Jr., CINCNELM and CINCSPECCOMME, flew in from London to Beirut airport and boarded  from which he commanded the remainder of the operation. The US withdrew its forces on 25 October 1958.

Eisenhower sent the diplomat Robert Daniel Murphy to Lebanon as his personal representative. Murphy played a significant role in convincing both sides of the conflict to reach a compromise by electing the moderate Christian general Fouad Chehab as incoming president, but allowing Chamoun to continue in power until the end of his term, on September 22.

Lebanese Prime Minister Rashid Karami formed a national reconciliation government after the end of the 1958 crisis.

See also
 Multinational Force in Lebanon
 Lebanese Civil War
 1982 Lebanon War
 Foreign interventions by the United States
 United States involvement in regime change

References

Bibliography

Further reading

Books and studies
 Alin, Erika G. The United States and the 1958 Lebanon Crisis, American Intervention in the Middle East, 1994.
 Brands, H.W. Into the Labyrinth: The United States and the Middle East, 1945-1993 (1994) excerpt pp 72–80.
 Gendzier, Irene L. Notes from the Minefield: United States Intervention in Lebanon and the Middle East 1945–1958, 1997
 Korbani, Agnes G. U.S. Intervention in Lebanon, 1958–1982: presidential decisionmaking, 1991.
 Schulimson, Jack. Marines in Lebanon 1958, Historical Branch, G-3 Division, Headquarters, U.S. Marine Corps, Washington, Department of the Navy, United States Marine Corps, 1966, 60 p.
 Wright, Quincy. "United States intervention in the Lebanon." American Journal of International Law 53.1 (1959): 112–125.
 Yaqub, Salim. Containing Arab Nationalism, The Eisenhower Doctrine and the Middle East, 2003.

Other languages
 Pierrick el Gammal, Politique intérieure et politique extérieure au Liban de 1958 à 1961 de Camille Chamoun à Fouad Chehab, Sorbonne University (Paris), 1991. (French)
 Nawaf Salam, L'insurrection de 1958 au Liban, Sorbonne University (Paris), 1979. (French)

Primary sources
 Mohammed Shafi Agwani, ed. The Lebanese Crisis, 1958: A Documentary Study, 1965.

External links
Global Security – Operation Blue Bat
Rapid Deployment Logistics: Lebanon, 1958 

Crisis
Lebanon Crisis
Arab nationalism in Lebanon
Arab nationalist rebellions
Articles containing video clips
Cold War military history of the United States
Conflicts in 1958
Proxy wars
United States Marine Corps in the 20th century
Lebanon–United States relations
United Arab Republic